David Howard Burcher (born 26 October 1950) is a former Wales international rugby union player. He was capped four times for Wales in 1977 and that same year he toured New Zealand with the British & Irish Lions, playing in one international. Burcher played club rugby for Newport RFC.

Notes

1950 births
Living people
Wales international rugby union players
Welsh rugby union players
British & Irish Lions rugby union players from Wales
Newport RFC players
Cardiff RFC players
Barbarian F.C. players
Newport HSOB RFC players
Rugby union players from Newport, Wales
Alumni of the University of Exeter
Rugby union centres
People educated at Newport High School